This is a list of the National Register of Historic Places listings in Iowa County, Iowa.

This is intended to be a complete list of the properties and districts on the National Register of Historic Places in Iowa County, Iowa, United States.  Latitude and longitude coordinates are provided for many National Register properties and districts; these locations may be seen together in a map.

There are 11 properties and districts listed on the National Register in the county, including 1 National Historic Landmark.

Current listings

|}

See also

 List of National Historic Landmarks in Iowa
 National Register of Historic Places listings in Iowa
 Listings in neighboring counties: Benton, Johnson, Keokuk, Linn, Poweshiek, Tama, Washington

References

Iowa
Buildings and structures in Iowa County, Iowa